Minuscule 687 (in the Gregory-Aland numbering), ε1124 (von Soden), is a Greek minuscule manuscript of the New Testament, on parchment. Palaeographically it has been assigned to the 11th century. The manuscript has survived in a fragmentary condition. Scrivener labelled it by 579e.

Description 

The codex contains fragments of the Gospel of Matthew, on 7 parchment leaves (size ). The text is written in two columns per page, 29 lines per page.

 Contents
Matthew 10:33-11:12, 13:44-14:6, 15:14-18.20-22.26-29.30-32, 15:34-17:10, 17:12-15.18-20.22-24; 17:26-18:16.

There is also a division into smaller sections, the Ammonian Sections, with a references to the Eusebian Canons. Lectionary markings were added by a later hand.

Text 

Kurt Aland the Greek text of the codex did not place in any Category.

History 

Scrivener and Gregory dated the manuscript to the 11th century. Currently the manuscript is dated by the INTF to the 11th century.

The manuscript once belonged to the Butler collection.

It was added to the list of New Testament manuscript by Scrivener (579) and Gregory (687).

The manuscript is housed at the British Library (Add MS 11868B), London.

See also 

 List of New Testament minuscules
 Biblical manuscript
 Textual criticism

References

Further reading 

 

Greek New Testament minuscules
13th-century biblical manuscripts
British Library additional manuscripts